Rodrigo Jesús Colombo (born 19 November 1992) is an Argentine professional footballer who plays as a centre-back for Atlanta.

Career
Colombo started in the youth of Argentine Primera División club Atlético de Rafaela, his first taste of senior football was when he was selected as a substitute for a Copa Argentina tie against Banfield in March 2012. He went onto make his senior debut in the same competition on 19 June 2013 in a loss to San Lorenzo. He made another Copa Argentina appearance prior to making his league debut in an away defeat to Huracán during the 2015 campaign. On 2 April 2016, Colombo was sent off for the first time in a Primera División match against Boca Juniors. He left Rafaela in January 2017 after the end of his contract.

In January 2017, Colombo joined Bolivian Primera División side Universitario de Sucre. He made his debut on 23 January in a Copa Libertadores match against Montevideo Wanderers. A move to Instituto fell through in August 2017. On 7 January 2018, Sport Huancayo of the Peruvian Primera División signed Colombo. Goals against Deportivo Binacional, Deportivo Municipal and Sport Rosario followed across thirty-four appearances in all competitions; the same tally he notched in Bolivia. In January 2019, Colombo signed for Independiente Rivadavia under Gabriel Gómez; who had tried to sign him for Instituto.

After eighteen months and one goal in twenty-eight matches with Independiente Rivadavia, Colombo headed to Greece with Super League side Volos in August 2020. His debut came on 13 September against Atromitos, which preceded his first goal arriving on 30 November versus Apollon Smyrnis.

Career statistics
.

References

External links

1992 births
Living people
Sportspeople from Córdoba Province, Argentina
Argentine footballers
Association football defenders
Argentine expatriate footballers
Argentine Primera División players
Bolivian Primera División players
Peruvian Primera División players
Primera Nacional players
Super League Greece players
Atlético de Rafaela footballers
Universitario de Sucre footballers
Sport Huancayo footballers
Independiente Rivadavia footballers
Volos N.F.C. players
Deportivo Maipú players
Club Atlético Atlanta footballers
Expatriate footballers in Bolivia
Expatriate footballers in Peru
Expatriate footballers in Greece
Argentine expatriate sportspeople in Bolivia
Argentine expatriate sportspeople in Peru
Argentine expatriate sportspeople in Greece